An Office of Consumer Affairs most often refers to a government office dealing with matters of consumer protection.

In different jurisdictions, it may be referred to as a department, an office, a ministry or a more local title.

Examples are:

 California Department of Consumer Affairs
 Swedish Consumer Agency
 Federal Trade Commission Bureau of Consumer Protection (part of the US Commerce department)
 Federal Ministry for Food, Agriculture and Consumer Protection (Germany)
 Office of Consumer Affairs (Canada) - Industry Canada government agency